Heroic Charge is a 1952 Italian war film directed by Francesco De Robertis. It is based on the battle of Izbushensky.

Plot 
Soviet Union. During the Second World War the third Savoy Cavalry arrives in a village that seems deserted, but a patrol on reconnaissance is greeted by a discharge of machine guns. After an initial opposition, the Italian military establish a good relationship with the local population.

Suddenly the order of departure arrives towards the advanced lines, threatened by the enemy. The Germans do not believe that the intervention of the Italian cavalry can be effective against regular troops but the cavalrymen disprove the fears of their allies by giving rise to the last and victorious charge at the turn of the Italian military history, which went down in history as the charge of Isbuscensky.

References

External links
 

1952 films
Eastern Front of World War II films
1950s Italian-language films
Italian war films
1952 war films
Italian black-and-white films
Italian World War II films
1950s Italian films